was a famous Japanese poet of the late Heian and early Kamakura period.

Biography
Born  in Kyoto to a noble family, he lived during the traumatic transition of power between the old court nobles and the new samurai warriors. After the start of the age of Mappō, Buddhism was considered to be in decline and no longer as effective a means of salvation. These cultural shifts during his lifetime led to a sense of melancholy in his poetry. As a youth, he worked as a guard to retired Emperor Toba, but in 1140 at age 22, for reasons now unknown, he quit worldly life to become a monk, taking the religious name .

He later took the pen name , meaning “Western Journey”, a reference to Amida Buddha and the Western paradise. He lived alone for long periods in his life in Saga, Mt. Koya, Mt. Yoshino, Ise, and many other places, but he is more known for the many long, poetic journeys he took to Northern Honshū that would later inspire Bashō in his Narrow Road to the Interior.

He was a good friend of Fujiwara no Teika.

 is Saigyō's personal poetry collection. Other collections that include poems by Saigyō are the Shin Kokin Wakashū and the Shika Wakashū.

He died at Hirokawa Temple in Kawachi Province (present-day Osaka Prefecture) at age 72.

Style
In Saigyō's time, the Man'yōshū was no longer a big influence on waka poetry, compared to the Kokin Wakashū. Where the Kokin Wakashū was concerned with subjective experience, word play, flow, and elegant diction (neither colloquial nor pseudo-Chinese), the Shin Kokin Wakashū (formed with poetry written by Saigyō and others writing in the same style) was less subjective, had fewer verbs and more nouns, was not as interested in word play, allowed for repetition, had breaks in the flow, was slightly more colloquial and more somber and melancholic. Due to the turbulent times, Saigyō focuses not just on mono no aware (sorrow from change) but also on sabi  (loneliness) and kanashi (sadness). Though he was a Buddhist monk, Saigyō was still very attached to the world and the beauty of nature.

Poetry examples

Many of his best-known poems express the tension he felt between renunciatory Buddhist ideals and his love of natural beauty. Most monks would have asked to die facing West, to be welcomed by the Buddha, but Saigyō finds the Buddha in the flowers:

To be "heartless" was an ideal of Buddhist monkhood, meaning one had abandoned all desire and attachment:

Saigyō travelled extensively, but one of his favorite places was Mount Yoshino, famous for its cherry blossoms:

Legacy
Saigyō's journeys were an inspiration for the court lady Lady Nijō, who records in her Towazugatari that she dreamed of writing a similar travel book after reading Saigyō's work at age 8. Nijō later followed in Saigyō's footsteps when she became a Buddhist nun, visiting many of the places he recorded.

Bashō subsequently looked back to Saigyō for artistic inspiration. For example, quoting Saigyō's poem on the pine tree at Shiogoshi, he wrote "Should anyone dare to write another poem on this pine tree, it would be like trying to add a sixth finger to his hand".

In popular culture 
 2016: The Great Passage, anime, episode 7

See also 
Eguchi (play)
The Priest and the Willow
Shigitatsu-an in Oiso, Kanagawa

Resources

Meredith McKinney. Gazing at the Moon: Buddhist Poems of Solitude, Shambhala Publications, 2021 .
Saigyô, Poems of a Mountain Home, translated by Burton Watson, Columbia University Press, 1991  cloth  pbk [233 pp.]
Saigyô, Mirror for the Moon: A Selection of Poems by Saigyô (1118-1190), translated by William R. LaFleur, New Directions 1978.
William R. LaFleur. Awesome Nightfall: The Life, Times, and Poetry of Saigyō. Boston: Wisdom Publications, 2003  pbk [177 pp] This is an expanded and matured reworking of the material in Mirror for the Moon.

References

External links
 Classical Japanese Database - has some poems by Saigyō in translations and in the original Japanese
 E-text of his poems in Japanese
 digital 西行庵
 山家集の研究

1118 births
1190 deaths
12th-century Japanese poets
Buddhist poets
Hyakunin Isshu poets
Heian period Buddhist clergy
Kamakura period Buddhist clergy